"Adelante" is a song by German electronic production duo Sash!. Taken from Trilenium (2000), the duo's third studio album, "Adelante" became a chart hit, reaching number one in Romania and Scotland, number two on the UK Singles Chart, and the top 10 in Australia, Flanders, Denmark, Finland, Norway, and Sweden. In Australia, the song was certified gold for shipments of over 35,000 copies, and in Sweden, it went platinum for shipments exceeding 30,000 units.

Track listings

 German and European CD single
 "Adelante" (original 7-inch) – 3:45
 "Adelante" (original 12-inch) – 6:50

 European maxi-CD single
 "Adelante" (original 7-inch) – 3:45
 "Adelante" (original 12-inch) – 6:50
 "Adelante" (Cosmic Gate remix) – 7:07
 "Adelante" (DuMonde remix) – 7:25
 "Adelante" (Avancada remix) – 7:31
 "Adelante" (original 7-inch without intro) – 3:35

 UK CD single
 "Adelante" (radio edit) – 3:32
 "Adelante" (Ruff Driverz remix) – 7:02
 "Adelante" (DuMonde remix) – 7:20

 UK 12-inch single
A1. "Adelante" (original 12-inch) – 6:45
B1. "Adelante" (Ruff Driverz remix) – 7:02
B2. "Adelante" (DuMonde remix) – 6:11

 UK cassette single
 "Adelante" (radio edit) – 3:32
 "Adelante" (Avancada remix) – 7:26

 Australian CD single
 "Adelante" (original 7-inch radio edit)
 "Adelante" (original 12-inch)
 "Adelante" (DuMonde remix)
 "Adelante" (Ruff Driverz remix)
 "Adelante" (Cosmic Gate remix)
 "Adelante" (Avancada remix)

Charts

Weekly charts

Year-end charts

Certifications

Release history

See also
 List of Romanian Top 100 number ones of the 2000s

References

External links
 Official website of Sash!

1999 singles
1999 songs
Multiply Records singles
Number-one singles in Romania
Number-one singles in Scotland
Spanish-language songs